HDE 316285 is a blue supergiant star in the constellation Sagittarius.  It is a candidate luminous blue variable and lies about 6,000 light years away in the direction of the galactic centre.

Discovery
HD 316285 was identified in 1925 as an unusual star having P Cygni lines in its spectrum, lines with both emission and absorption components offset by a doppler shift.  It was classified as a Be star although it is now known to be a supergiant and the class of Be stars excludes supergiants, and was included in the Mount Wilson Observatory catalogue of B and A stars with bright lines of hydrogen (MWC) as entry 272. In 1956, it was reported that the mission was due to an expanding atmosphere rather than the circumstellar discs of less evolved Be stars.  In 1972 it was discovered to have an infrared excess, an unusually high emission at infrared wavelengths due to surrounding warm dust.

In 1961, HD 316285 was catalogued as planetary nebula Bl3-11, although that classification was quickly cast into doubt.

Variability
HD 316285 is listed in the General Catalogue of Variable Stars as a variable Be star with a range of about one tenth of a magnitude.  The International Variable Star Index classifies it as an S Doradus variable and it is considered to be a candidate luminous blue variable.

Properties
The spectrum shows that HD 316285 has only 1.5 times as much hydrogen as helium and elevated levels of carbon, nitrogen, and oxygen, so it can be identified as a highly evolved star.  It has been calculated to be losing mass at the rate of  every four thousand years via its stellar wind.

Gaia astrometry suggests a distance much larger than the accepted 1.9kpc, and would imply a much higher luminosity.  It may even lie close to the Galactic Center.

HD 316285 has been identified as a possible type II-b or type IIn supernova candidate in modelling of the fate of stars 20 to 25 times the mass of the Sun.  It has been shown that these supernovae may explode directly from stars in an LBV phase after spending time as a red supergiant.

A possible companion has been reported on the basis of a helical outflow of material apparently originating from HD 316285.  This would be caused by a jet being twisted into a spiral shape by orbital motion.

References

Sagittarius (constellation)
Luminous blue variables
Sagittarii, V4375
087136
316285
CD-27 11944
Emission-line stars
B-type supergiants